Maryam Soltani is an Iranian actress.

Background 
Maryam Soltani was born in Tehran in 1975. She is a graduate of Hamid Samandarian acting academy. In 2000, she had her first acting experience in the film "Entezar".

Selected filmography
 Ba Khaneman (2020)
 Matador (2013)
 Dokhtare Shahe Parion (2011)
The Redemption TV series (2010)
 Rich and Poor (TV series) (2010)
 Ekhrajiha 3 (2010)
 Se Dar Chahar (2008)
 Roozegar-e Gharib (2007)
 Walking Tall (2005)
 Kalantar (2003)
 Yeki Mesl Man (2003)

References

External links
 

1975 births
Living people
People from Tehran
Actresses from Tehran
Iranian film actresses
Iranian television actresses